Anthony Harding  (born 1946) is a British archaeologist specialising in European prehistory. He was a professor at Durham University and the University of Exeter and president of the European Association of Archaeologists between 2003 and 2009. Following his doctoral research on Mycenaean Greece, Harding's work has mainly concerned the European Bronze Age, including major studies of prehistoric warfare and the prehistory of salt.

Education and career 
Harding was born in Bromley, Kent in 1946 and studied Classics and prehistoric archaeology at the University of Cambridge and Charles University in Prague. He received his doctorate from Cambridge in 1973, with a dissertation on Mycenaean Greece supervised by John Coles. He taught at Durham University from 1973 to 2004 and was appointed Professor in 1990. In 2004 he moved to the University of Exeter, where he was the Anniversary Professor of Archaeology until his retirement in 2015.

Harding was elected a Fellow of the Society of Antiquaries in 1981, a Fellow of the British Academy in 2001, and is a corresponding member of the German Archaeological Institute and the Istituto Italiano di Preistoria e Protostoria. He was the president of the European Association of Archaeologists from 2003 to 2009. Following his retirement, he spent a year as guest professor at the Ludwig Maximilian University of Munich.

Research 
Harding's research focuses on prehistoric archaeology, particularly the Bronze Age of central and Eastern Europe. His work includes several volumes on warfare and violence in prehistory (Velim: Violence and Death in Bronze Age Bohemia, 2007; Warriors and Weapons in Bronze Age Europe, 2007) and on the prehistory of salt (Salt in Prehistoric Europe, 2013; Explorations in Salt Archaeology in the Carpathian Zone, 2013, with Valerii Kavruk). He has also written two major syntheses about Bronze Age Europe, The Bronze Age of Europe (1979, with John Coles), and European Societies in the Bronze Age (2000).  During his stay in Munich he wrote Bronze Age Lives (2021). He has directed excavations at sites Velim-Skalka in the Czech Republic, Sobiejuchy in Poland, and Baile Figa in Romania.

References 

Living people
1946 births
People from Bromley
British archaeologists
Prehistorians
Alumni of the University of Cambridge
Charles University alumni
Academics of Durham University
Academics of the University of Exeter
Academic staff of the Ludwig Maximilian University of Munich
Fellows of the British Academy
Fellows of the Society of Antiquaries of London